Tom Smith (born 24 February 1988) is an English Christian musician and worship leader, who plays a Christian pop and EDM style of worship music. He released, Sound of Heaven, an extended play, in 2014.

Early life and personal life
Tom Smith was born on 24 February 1988, in Littlehampton, West Sussex, and he resides in Watford, Hertfordshire, England, with his wife, Susi. He has a son named Sonny Smith who was born in May 2017.

Music career
Smith's music recording career commenced in 2015, with the release, Sound of Heaven, an extended play, on 6 July 2015, independently. He is also showcased on the Soul Survivor albums, Love Takes Over, Never Gonna Stop, The Promise and Standing on the Edge

Discography
EPs
 Sound of Heaven (6 July 2015)
 Everyday (27 July 2018)

References

External links
 Official website
 Press Release at Jesus Freak Hideout

1988 births
Living people
English Christians
Dubstep musicians
English songwriters